In Real Life is a Canadian reality show in which eighteen young contestants aged 12–14 race across North America and compete in a series of real-life jobs, aimed to "discover the skills, strength, and stamina it takes to make it in real life." The show is developed and produced by Apartment 11 Productions.

The second season premiered on YTV on October 4, 2010 and the season finale aired on December 6.

The winner was 13-year-old Tea Vlatkovic from Niagara Falls, Ontario.

New to this season was the introduction of the Final Webisode, which aired exclusively on YTV.com.

Contestants

Ages at time of filming

Results

 This contestant won the big reward
 This contestant won the wrench
 This contestant found the shield
 This contestant withdrew from the competition due to an injury
 Some contestants received a new team member. The original teams were: 
Red Team: Amber and Jumoke 
Purple Team: Tea and Eric Z. 
 Only one contestant was eliminated during this episode as there was a showdown between the two contestants of the last team. The winner of this showdown would then continue on in the competition
Beginning in this experience, all teams were dissolved and competitors competed alone
Red means the contestant was eliminated.
Dark Red means the contestant used a shield but was eliminated.
Orange means the contestant competed in a duel but was eliminated.
Purple  means the contestant used the shield to escape elimination.
Violet  means the contestant won a duel to escape elimination.
Pink means the contestant was chosen as a replacement partner to escape elimination.
Gold means the contestant won the competition.
Silver means the contestant was the runner-up.
» represents the contestant who used the wrench, 
« represents the contestant who got delayed by it.

Episode Summary

Episode 1: Wilderness Rescuers 
Airdate: October 4, 2010

Location: Elora, Ontario

Eric Zhang of Purple Team withdrew due to injury, and his partner Tea managed to cross the finish line on her own. Red Team came in last, and Tea picked Amber from Red Team to be her new partner, so only Jumoke was eliminated.
 Prize: Camping Set
 Shield: Found by Yellow Team (Bryanne & Tanner)

Episode 2: Spies 
Airdate: October 11, 2010

Location: Montréal and Sainte-Catherine, Quebec

 Prize: Portable Video iWear
 Wrench Used on: Green Team
 Shield: Not Found

Episode 3: Chefs 
Airdate: October 18, 2010

Location: Montréal, Québec

 Prize: Digital Camera
 Wrench Used on: Brown Team
 Shield: Not Found

Episode 4: World Class Athletes 
Airdate: October 25, 2010

Location: Lake Placid, New York

 Prize: Skateboard
 Wrench Used on: Purple Team
 Shield: Found by Teal Team (Sam & Allison)

Episode 5: Lobster Fishers 
Airdate: November 1, 2010

Location: Ingonish, Nova Scotia

 Prize: Underwater goggles with cameras
 Wrench Used on: Teal Team
 Shield: Not Found/ Used by Teal Team (Sam & Allison) and Yellow Team (Bryanne & Tanner)

Episode 6: Navy Special Ops 
Airdate: November 8, 2010

Location: Halifax, Nova Scotia

 Prize: HD Flip Camera
 Wrench Used on: Teal Team
 Shield: Found by Green Team (Remington & Christian)/ Used by Green Team (Remington & Christian)

Episode 7: Sheep Ranchers 
Airdate: November 15, 2010

Location: Lava Hot Springs, Idaho

 Sam and Allison, from the Teal Team, participated in a final showdown — roping a target - to determine who would be eliminated. Each challenger was given five different positions, each worth a different score, and five chances to rack up the most points.  Sam was able to score a total of 8 points in four tries and was safe.  Allison was unable to rope a single target in her five tries and was eliminated.
 Prize: Giant Mountain Bikes
 Wrench Used on: Green Team
 Shield: Not Found

Episode 8: Video Game Creators 
Airdate: November 22, 2010

Location: Chicago, Illinois

Starting in Episode 8 teams were dissolved and each challenger competed individually
Superscript indicates points earned and relative time that each challenger begins to look for the clue card. Superscripts in brackets indicate points earned on that particular task.
 Prize: PSP Go
 Shield: Not Found

Episode 9: Dolphin Trainers 
Airdate: November 29, 2010

Location: Key Largo, Florida

 Prize: Kodak Playsport Underwater Camera
 Wrench Used on: Christian
 Shield: Not Found

Episode 10: Astronauts 
Airdate: December 6, 2010Location:Fort Lauderdale, Titusville and Orlando, Florida''

Numbers of the superscript indicate total points earned to task; numbers in brackets indicate points earned on that particular task.
 Champion Prize: $10,000 Scholarship and Trip for 4 to the Caribbean
 Consolation Prize: Celestron Computerized Telescope
 Wrench Used on: Christian

Final Webisode
New to season 2 is the introduction of the final webisode in which two challengers came back to compete in a final showdown. The selection of the two challengers were based on popularity: fans play Race to the Finish on YTV webside and put forth their points to their favourite challenger
Tristen Lee and Bryanne Hordal were selected to compete. They experienced the training required to be a skydiver. After three rounds of challenges, Tristen won 10 points, and Bryanne won 8 points, making Tristen the Final Webisode winner.

Season 2 Records

References

https://web.archive.org/web/20111208063659/http://inreallife.apartment11.tv/?season=2

2010 Canadian television seasons